Tony Quinn may refer to:

Tony Quinn (businessman), an Irish entrepreneur and founder of the Educo Seminar
Tony Quinn (footballer), an English footballer